Thioredoxin-related transmembrane protein 4 also known as thioredoxin domain-containing protein 13 is a protein that in humans is encoded by the TMX4 gene.

References

Further reading